A slave name is the personal name given by others to an enslaved person, or a name inherited from enslaved ancestors. The modern use of the term applies mostly to African Americans and Afro-Caribbeans who are descended from enslaved Africans who retain their name given to their ancestors by the enslavers.

Ancient Rome
In Rome, slaves were given a single name by their owner. A slave who was freed might keep his or her slave name and adopt the former owner's name as a praenomen and nomen. As an example, one historian says that "a man named Publius Larcius freed a male slave named Nicia, who was then called Publius Larcius Nicia."

Historian Harold Whetstone Johnston writes of instances in which a slave's former owner chose to ignore custom and simply chose a name for the freedman.

African Americans

A number of African Americans and Afro-Caribbeans have changed their names out of the belief that the names they were given at birth were slave names. An individual's name change often coincides with a religious conversion (Muhammad Ali changed his name from Cassius Clay, Malcolm X from Malcolm Little, and Louis Farrakhan changed his from Louis Eugene Walcott, for example)  or involvement with the black nationalist movement, in this later case usually adopting names of African origin (e.g., Amiri Baraka and Assata Shakur).

Some organizations encourage African Americans to abandon their slave names. The Nation of Islam is perhaps the best-known of them. In his 1965 book, Message to the Blackman in America, Nation of Islam leader Elijah Muhammad writes often of slave names. Some of his comments include:

 "You must remember that slave-names will keep you a slave in the eyes of the civilized world today. You have seen, and recently, that Africa and Asia will not honor you or give you any respect as long as you are called by the white man's name."
 "You are still called by your slave-masters' names. By rights, by international rights, you belong to the white man of America. He knows that. You have never gotten out of the shackles of slavery. You are still in them."

The black nationalist US Organization also advocates for African-Americans to change their slave names and adopt African names.

Other references
Irish singer Sinéad O'Connor stated in 2017 that she had changed her legal name to Magda Davitt, saying in an interview that she wished to be "free of the patriarchal slave names." On her conversion to Islam in 2018, she adopted the Muslim name Shuhada' Sadaqat.

See also
 Nation of Islam

References

External links
 Nalolon 
 Manjack library 
 Maria Teixeira, anthropologist 

Human names
Name
Naming controversies